Karen Britto is an American politician from Maryland and a member of the Democratic Party. She was a member of the Maryland House of Delegates representing District 16 in Montgomery County from 2010 to 2011. Britto was appointed by Governor Martin O'Malley to serve the final months of William A. Bronrott's term when he resigned to accept a presidential appointment in the U.S. Department of Transportation. In 2016, Britto was a Democratic Party presidential elector for Hillary Clinton.

References

External links 
 
 Karen Britto at Vote Smart

21st-century African-American politicians
21st-century African-American women
21st-century American politicians
21st-century American women politicians
African-American state legislators in Maryland
African-American women in politics
Democratic Party members of the Maryland House of Delegates
Howard University alumni
Living people
People from Montgomery County, Maryland
Villanova University alumni
Women state legislators in Maryland